WBHB may refer to:

 WBHB-FM, a radio station (101.5 FM) licensed to serve Waynesboro, Pennsylvania, United States,
 WBHB (AM), a defunct radio station (1240 AM) formerly licensed to serve Fitzgerald, Georgia, United States
 WTGD, a radio station (105.1 FM) licensed to serve Bridgewater, Virginia, United States, which held the call sign WBHB-FM from February 2005 to December 2008